Deh Bahar (also Romanized as Deh Bahār; also known as Dehbahā) is a village in Gilvan Rural District, in the Central District of Tarom County, Zanjan Province, Iran. At the 2006 census, its population was 757, in 183 families.

References 

Populated places in Tarom County